Shahin & Sepehr (Shahin Shahida and Sepehr Haddad) are an Iranian-American guitarist duo. Sepehr Haddad is also the author of the historical fiction novel, " A Hundred Sweet Promises" by Appleyard & Sons Publishing.

Their music is mainly composed of Spanish guitar melodies fused with components of soft rock, flamenco, jazz, new age, and influences of traditional music of Iran. Their influences also include artists such as Cat Stevens among others.

The group resides in Washington D.C. They have released eight CDs on the Higher Octave Music / EMI labels and are currently working on their next release. Their CDs have charted on the Billboard and R&R and Gavin Charts. They have collaborated with such noted artists as Dom Camardella (producer for Ottmar Liebert, Flora Purim, and Willie & Lobo).

Discography

Studio albums

 One Thousand & One Nights (1994)
 e (1995)
 Aria (1996)
 World Cafe (1998)
 East/West Highway: The Best of Shahin & Sepehr (2000)
 Nostalgia (2002)

Singles 

 Fields of Change (2008)
 Casablanca - Dance Mix (2009)

Other Compilation Appearances 

Higher Octave Collection 2: Music from Around the World, For Around The Clock (1995) (Higher Octave Music)
Panorama: An Expansive Collection of Music from Around the World That Inspires the Heart, Mind and Soul (1996) (Higher Octave Music)
Guitarisma: The Charisma, Passion & Romance of the Guitar (1997) (Higher Octave Music)
Guitarisma 2: The Charisma, Mystique and Pure Expression of the Guitar (1998) (Higher Octave Music)
One Light: Illuminations (1999) (Illuminations/EMI)
Guitar Greats: The Best of New Flamenco - Volume I (2000) (Baja/TSR Records)
Esoterotica: An Innerplay Of Love & Music: Celebrating Higher Octave's 15th Anniversary (2001) (Higher Octave Music)
Channel Islands: The Essence Collection (2001) (Higher Octave Music)  
Highway 1: The Essence Collection (2001) (Higher Octave Music)
Night Moves: The Essence Collection (2001) (Higher Octave Music)
Barcelona: Music Celebrating the Flavors of the World (2004) (Williams Sonoma)
Guitar Music For Small Rooms 3 (2004) (WEA)
Gypsy Spice: Best Of New Flamenco (2009) (Baja/TSR Records)
Guitar Greats: The Best of New Flamenco - Volume III (2013) (Baja/TSR Records)

See also 
New Flamenco
Flamenco rumba
List of Iranian musicians
Lara & Reyes
Strunz & Farah
Young & Rollins
Willie & Lobo
Johannes Linstead

References

External links 
 
 [YouTube|https://www.youtube.com/channel/UCy33NWiDC-wDoZC13_IOFVQ]
 Shahin & Sepehr on Last.fm
 
 Shahin & Sepehr on Amazon
 Shahin & Sepehr at Iranian.com
 Sepehr Haddad author website

Flamenco groups
Iranian musical groups
Musical groups established in 1994